Waxploitation is an American record label, artist management company and music publisher, which was founded in 1996 by Jeff Antebi.

The company is best known for developing the careers of artists including Gnarls Barkley, Broken Bells, and Danger Mouse as well as projects like Danger Doom with MF DOOM, Rome with Jack White and Norah Jones, and Dark Night of the Soul with David Lynch and Sparklehorse.

Waxploitation managed Danger Mouse's producing career from 2004 to 2010, an era during which he produced albums by The Black Keys, Beck, and Gorillaz, as well as the infamous Grey Album.

In addition to creative ventures, Waxploitation has a longstanding commitment to philanthropy including their ongoing Causes album series has included songs from The Shins, LCD Soundsystem, Diplo, Death Cab for Cutie, Bloc Party, Devendra Banhart, The Decemberists, Sharon Jones & Dap Kings among many more.

In 2017, Waxploitation published the book entitled Stories for Ways & Means featuring original collaborations with Tom Waits, Nick Cave, Frank Black, Justin Vernon, Laura Marling, Devendra Banhart, Amadou Bagayoko, Gary Numan, Kathleen Hanna, and more.

Associated artists
 Danger Mouse 
 Danger Mouse and Sparklehorse 
 Broken Bells 
 Danger Mouse and Daniele Luppi – Rome (2011)
 Gnarls Barkley
 Danger Doom 
 The Grey Album
 La Yegros 
 Black Moth Super Rainbow
 Teargas & Plateglass
 Tha Alkaholiks
 Tweaker
 R.L. Boyce

References

External links
Waxploitation Records homepage

American record labels
Record labels established in 1996
Music publishing companies of the United States
Electronic music record labels
Indie rock record labels
Hip hop record labels